"Go2DaMoon" is a song by American rapper Playboi Carti, featuring fellow American rapper Kanye West. It was released as the second track from Carti's second studio album, Whole Lotta Red, on December 25, 2020.

Background
The song was first teased by Carti on November 24, 2020, when he posted a video of himself dancing to the song in studio, while thanking ASAP Bari. The song lasts just under two minutes, opening with West's verse, which was considered to be reminscent and nostalgic of his older work. It was produced by Outtatown and Wheezy, who revealed via Instagram that his production tag was removed from the song.

Reception
HipHopDX and HotNewHipHop both reported how Whole Lotta Red received a "lukewarm" reception from listeners upon its release, however, some praise was aimed at West's verse on "Go2DaMoon", considered a "redeeming quality" on the album. Attention was also geared toward West's line about Jesus, due to Whole Lotta Red being perceived to have Satanic connotations, stemming from the album's merch, which features inverted crosses, among other imagery. Uproxx's Aaron Williams found West's verse to be uninspiring, while in their album review, Pitchforks Paul A. Thompson felt it, along with Kid Cudi and Future's appearances, "should have been left on a hard drive somewhere". NPR's Latesha Harris named it a standout track from the album.

Commercial performance
The song was one of four tracks from Whole Lotta Red to debut on both the Billboard Hot 100 and the Rolling Stone Top 100, accumulating 6.3 million streams that week.

Charts

References

2020 songs
Playboi Carti songs
Songs written by Playboi Carti
Kanye West songs
Songs written by Kanye West
Songs written by Wheezy (record producer)
Song recordings produced by Wheezy (record producer)
Interscope Records singles
Songs about drugs